Adam (also known as Grounded, and Quad) is a 2020 American drama film starring Aaron Paul, Jeff Daniels and Tom Berenger.

Filming took place in Detroit in 2010, but the film was not released until 2020.

Plot
A hard-living salesman becomes a quadriplegic after an accident.

Cast
 Aaron Paul as Adam Niskar
 Jeff Daniels as Mickey
 Tom Berenger as Jerry 
 Lena Olin as Yevgenia
 Tom Sizemore as "Lucky" 
 Shannon Lucio as Christine
 Michael Weston as Ross
 Stephanie Koenig as Brandy
 Celia Weston as Arlene
 Yuri Sardarov as Nick Khan
 Paul Walter Hauser as Trent

References

External links
 

2020 films
American drama films
Films about paraplegics or quadriplegics
Films shot in Michigan
2020 drama films
2020s English-language films
2020s American films